Regina Lakeview is a provincial electoral district for the Legislative Assembly of Saskatchewan, Canada.

Members of the Legislative Assembly

Election results

|-
 
|NDP
|John Nilson
|align="right"|3,908
|align="right"|48.37
|align="right"|+0.76

|- bgcolor="white"
!align="left" colspan=3|Total
!align="right"|
!align="right"|100.00
!align="right"|

|-
 
|NDP
|John Nilson
|align="right"|4,323
|align="right"|47.67
|align="right"|-9.29

|- bgcolor="white"
!align="left" colspan=3|Total
!align="right"|9,068
!align="right"|100.00
!align="right"|

|-
 
|NDP
|John Nilson
|align="right"|4,988
|align="right"|56.91
|align="right"| +7.60

|- bgcolor="white"
!align="left" colspan=3|Total
!align="right"|8,976
!align="right"|100.00
!align="right"|

|-
 
|NDP
|John Nilson
|align="right"|4,207
|align="right"|49.31
|align="right"| -5.38

|- bgcolor="white"
!align="left" colspan=3|Total
!align="right"|8,532
!align="right"|100.00
!align="right"|

|-
 
|NDP
|John Nilson
|align="right"|4,807
|align="right"|54.69
|align="right"|–

|- bgcolor="white"
!align="left" colspan=3|Total
!align="right"|8,976
!align="right"|100.00
!align="right"|

|-
 
|NDP
|Louise Simard
|align="right"|4,185
|align="right"|47.51%
|align="right"|+5.26

| style="width: 130px" |Progressive Conservative
|Tim Embury
|align="right"|2,989
|align="right"|33.94%
|align="right"|-18.06

|- bgcolor="white"
!align="left" colspan=3|Total
!align="right"|8,808
!align="right"|100.00%
!align="right"|

|-

| style="width: 130px" |Progressive Conservative
|Tim Embury
|align="right"|4,688
|align="right"|52.00%
|align="right"|+29.25
 
|NDP
|Doug McArthur
|align="right"|3,808
|align="right"|42.24%
|align="right"|-3,04

|- bgcolor="white"
!align="left" colspan=3|Total
!align="right"|9,016
!align="right"|100.00%
!align="right"|

|-
 
|NDP
|Doug McArthur
|align="right"|3,351
|align="right"|45.28%
|align="right"|+11.66

| style="width: 130px" |Progressive Conservative
|Ian McPherson
|align="right"|1,684
|align="right"|22.75%
|align="right"|-0.07
|- bgcolor="white"
!align="left" colspan=3|Total
!align="right"|7,401
!align="right"|100.00%
!align="right"|

|-

 
|NDP
|Henri Saucier
|align="right"|2,603
|align="right"|33.61%
|align="right"|-12.21

|Prog. Conservative
|Reg Watts
|align="right"|1,767
|align="right"|22.82%
|align="right"|-
|- bgcolor="white"
!align="left" colspan=3|Total
!align="right"|7,744
!align="right"|100.00%
!align="right"|

|-

 
|NDP
|Walter H. Coates
|align="right"|4,373
|align="right"|45.82%
|align="right"|
|- bgcolor="white"
!align="left" colspan=3|Total
!align="right"|9,543
!align="right"|100.00%
!align="right"|

References

External links 
Website of the Legislative Assembly of Saskatchewan
Map of Regina Lakeview riding as of 2016

Politics of Regina, Saskatchewan
Saskatchewan provincial electoral districts